The Marash Sanjak, previously known as Sanjak of Ablistan, was a prefecture (sanjak) of the Ottoman Empire, located in modern-day Turkey. The city of Marash was the Sanjak's capital. It had a population of 187,899 in 1914.

History
Marash was part of zone of French influence according in Treaty of Sèvres, but after the success of Turkish War of Independence, Maraş, Antep and Urfa (sanjaks of former Halep Eyalet) were taken back by Turkey.

Subdistricts 
The sanjak was made up of five districts (kazas):
 Kaza of Marash (Maraş)
 Kaza of Zeytun
 Kaza of Elbistan
 Kaza of Andırın
 Kaza of Pazarcık

References

History of Kahramanmaraş
States and territories established in 1549
Sanjaks of Ottoman Syria
1549 establishments in the Ottoman Empire
1918 disestablishments in the Ottoman Empire